
Gmina Grodziec is a rural gmina (administrative district) in Konin County, Greater Poland Voivodeship, in west-central Poland.

Villages
Gmina Grodziec contains the villages and settlements of Aleksandrówek, Biała, Biała-Kolonia, Biskupice, Biskupice-Kolonia, Bystrzyca, Czarnybród, Grodziec, Janów, Junno, Konary, Królików, Królików Czwarty, Lądek, Łagiewniki, Lipice, Mokre, Nowa Ciświca, Nowa Huta, Nowe Grądy, Nowy Borowiec, Stara Ciświca, Stara Huta, Stare Grądy, Stary Borowiec, Stary Tartak, Tartak, Wielołęka, Wycinki and Zaguźnica.

Neighbouring gminas
Gmina Grodziec is bordered by the gminas of Blizanów, Chocz, Gizałki, Rychwał, Rzgów, Stawiszyn and Zagórów.

References
Polish official population figures 2006

Grodziec
Konin County